Kirk's white-eye (Zosterops kirki) is a species of bird in the family Zosteropidae. It is endemic to the Comoros Islands. It was previously considered a subspecies of the Malagasy white-eye. Its common and binomial name are in honour of explorer John Kirk.

References

Zosterops
Birds of the Comoros
Birds described in 1880